Gammel Strand 52/Naboløs 5 is a  corner building overlooking Slotsholmens Kanal in central Copenhagen, Denmark. It was listed on the Danish registry of protected buildings and places in 1945.

History

18th century

The site was in 1689 part of a larger property (No. 19, Strand Quarter) owned by Jørgen Ehlers. He is remembered for founding Elers' Kollegium in Store Kannikestræde. In 1756, No. 19 was owned by post inspector Peter Bech.

The property was together with most of the other buildings in the area destroyed in the Copenhagen Fire of 1795. The site was after the fire acquired by master builder Hans Christian Ondrup (1751-1814).  He divided into three separate properties. The corner building was as No. 16A constructed by him in 179697. It was followed by No. 19B (now Naboløs 3 in 1798 and finally No. 19C at the corner with Læderstræde in 1798-99.

19th century
 
The property was in the new cadastre of 1806 listed as No. 16. It was by then owned by bookdealer G. L. Buch.

The building was in 1826 acquired by chancery secretary Emil Hjort (179769). He was in 1830 appointed as cassier of Danish Chancery, a position in which he remained for 30 years. His property on Gammel Strand was at the time of the 1834 census home to a total of 31 people. Hjort was himself residing with his wife, two children and a maid in the apartment on the first floor. Christopher Heinrich Frederiksen, a retired officer in the Fire Corps, was residing with his wife, two unmarried children and a maid on the third floor. 

Frederik Hjort owned the building until his death in 1869. His property was home to a total of 27 residents at the time of the 1860 census.

 The owner was still residing in the first floor apartment. He lived there with his 30-year-old son Andreas and his 24-year-old daughter Sophie Marie and a maid. His brother Johan Edvard Peter Hjort and sister Andrea Marie Hjort resided together in the apartment on the third floor. Alexander Ballen, a merchant, resided on the ground floor with his wife, two children, a maid and a female cock. Jens Petersen, an employee at the adjacent Royal Pawn, resided in the basement with his wife and five children.

The painter Carl Bloch lived in an apartment on the first floor from 1873 to 1875. The film director Carl Th. Dreyer lived on the third flor in 1932–1933.

20th and 21st centuries
 

The property was in 2008 owned by Atlas Ejendomme A/S, later renamed Landic Property Denmark A/S. In October 2009, Jeudan acquired Landic Property Denmark's portfolio of 32 properties, including Gammel Strand , for DKK 2 billion.

Architecture
The building consists of four storeys over a high cellar and is constructed in red bricks of the type known as Brehmen bricks. It has five bays towards the canal, a centered corner bay and seven bays towards the street Naboløs.

The building was listed on the Danish registry of protected buildings and places on 16 July 1945.

Today
The building is today owned by Jeudan.

References

External links

 BBR information
 Frederik Gjort

Listed residential buildings in Copenhagen
Residential buildings completed in 1798